Frederick Edward Grine is an American paleoanthropologist. He is a Professor of anthropology and anatomical sciences at the State University of New York at Stony Brook.

He received his bachelor's degree from Washington & Jefferson College, and his Ph.D at the University of the Witwatersrand, South Africa in 1984.

His research focuses on the hominin fossil record, during the Pliocene and early Pleistocene and the reconstruction of phylogenetic relationships through dental morphology. Among his most important work has been the analysis of dental microwear in order to reconstruct early hominin dietary habits. Together with his former graduate student, David Strait, he has also published influential studies of early hominin phylogenetic relationships.

Dr. Grine is a major proponent in the argument that species of robust australopithecine should be given their own genus name, Paranthropus. He also argues that the genus Australopithecus is paraphyletic which would require a new taxonomic designation for specimens included under Australopithecus afarensis to Praeanthropus africanus.

He is the editor of Evolutionary History of the Robust Australopithecines (Transaction Publishers) and co-editor of Primate Phylogeny (Academic Press) and "The First Humans: Origin and Early Evolution of the Genus Homo (Springer). He is also author of the widely used anatomical textbook Regional Human Anatomy: a Laboratory Workbook for Use With Models And Prosections (McGraw-Hill College). In addition to this, Dr. Grine has published well over 150 peer-reviewed scientific research articles.

He is also known for his work in leading the team that dated the Hofmeyr Skull, discovered in 1952 near the town of Hofmeyr, in the Eastern Cape Province of South Africa, to 36,000 years before present. This skull probably represents the population ancestral to most modern living humans.

References

External links
 Official web page at SUNY

American anthropologists
Washington & Jefferson College alumni
Living people
Stony Brook University faculty
Year of birth missing (living people)